This is a list of cases reported in volume 4 U.S. (4 Dall.) of United States Reports, decided by the Supreme Court of the United States in 1799 and 1800. Case reports from other tribunals also appear in 4 U.S. (4 Dall.).

Alexander Dallas and Dallas' Reports 
Not all of the cases reported in 4 U.S. (4 Dall.) are from the United States Supreme Court. Included are decisions from various city, state, and lower federal courts sitting in Philadelphia, dating from the colonial period and the first decade after independence, as well as reports from a state court of Delaware, and the British Privy Council in an appeal from New Hampshire. 
Alexander J. Dallas, a Philadelphia lawyer and later United States Secretary of the Treasury, had been in the business of reporting local law cases for newspapers and periodicals. When the US Supreme Court sat in Philadelphia from 1791–1800, he collected their cases as well, and later began compiling his case reports in a bound volume which he called Reports of cases ruled and adjudged in the courts of Pennsylvania, before and since the Revolution.

When the US Supreme Court along with the rest of the new federal government moved in 1791 from the former capital, New York City, to the nation's temporary capital in Philadelphia, Dallas was appointed the Supreme Court's first unofficial and unpaid Supreme Court Reporter. (Court reporters in that age received no salary, but were expected to profit from the publication and sale of their compiled decisions.) Dallas continued to collect and publish Pennsylvania and other decisions, adding federal Supreme Court cases to his reports. Dallas published four volumes of decisions during his tenure as Reporter, known as the Dallas Reports.

The Supreme Court moved to the new capital city of Washington D.C. in 1800. Dallas remained in Philadelphia; William Cranch then replaced him as Reporter of Decisions of the Supreme Court of the United States.

Nominative reports 
In 1874, the U.S. government created the United States Reports, and retroactively numbered older privately-published case reports as part of the new series. As a result, cases appearing in volumes 1–90 of U.S. Reports have dual citation forms; one for the volume number of U.S. Reports, and one for the volume number of the reports named for the relevant reporter of decisions (these are called "nominative reports"). As such, volumes 1–4 of United States Reports correspond to volumes 1–4 of Dallas' Reports. The dual citation form of, for example, Turner v. Bank of North America is 4 U.S. (4 Dall.) 8 (1799).

Courts in 4 U.S. (4 Dall.) 
The cases reported in 4 U.S. (4 Dall.) come from a miscellany of tribunals in the United States and Britain: the Supreme Court of the United States; the Supreme Court of Pennsylvania (Pa.); the Pennsylvania High Court of Errors and Appeals (Pa. Ct. Err. & App.) (which from its creation in 1780 to its dissolution in 1808 was the court of last resort in the Pennsylvania judiciary); the Delaware Court of Errors and Appeals (Del. Ct. Err. & App.); the Mayor's Court of Philadelphia; the United States Circuit Court for the District of Pennsylvania (C.C.D. Pa.); the Privy Council of the United Kingdom (P.C.). (To avoid confusion, the Pennsylvania Court of Errors and Appeals will be cited as "Pa. Ct. Err. & App." rather than as "Pa.", although the latter abbreviation should be used, according to Bluebook rules, for the highest court in Pennsylvania at a particular time. Rather, "Pa." will consistently be used to indicate the Supreme Court of Pennsylvania.)

Justices of the Supreme Court at the time of 4 U.S. (4 Dall.) 

The Supreme Court is established by Article III, Section 1 of the Constitution of the United States, which says: "The judicial Power of the United States, shall be vested in one supreme Court . . .". The size of the Court is not specified; the Constitution leaves it to Congress to set the number of justices. Under the Judiciary Act of 1789 Congress originally fixed the number of justices at six (one chief justice and five associate justices). Since 1789 Congress has varied the size of the Court from six to seven, nine, ten, and back to nine justices (always including one chief justice).

When the cases in 4 U.S. (4 Dall.) were decided, the Court comprised six of the following seven justices at one time:

Notable case in 4 U.S. (4 Dall.)

New York v. Connecticut 

New York v. Connecticut, 4 U.S. (4 Dall.) 1 (1799), is a 1799 case in the Supreme Court of the United States between the State of New York and the State of Connecticut. The case was the first in which the Supreme Court exercised its original jurisdiction under Article III of the United States Constitution to hear controversies between two states.

Citation style 

Under the Judiciary Act of 1789 the federal court structure at the time comprised District Courts, which had general trial jurisdiction; Circuit Courts, which had mixed trial and appellate (from the US District Courts) jurisdiction; and the United States Supreme Court, which had appellate jurisdiction over the federal District and Circuit courts—and for certain issues over state courts. The Supreme Court also had limited original jurisdiction (i.e., in which cases could be filed directly with the Supreme Court without first having been heard by a lower federal or state court). There were one or more federal District Courts and/or Circuit Courts in each state, territory, or other geographical region.

Bluebook citation style is used for case names, citations, and jurisdictions. 
 e.g.,"C.C.D.N.J." = United States Circuit Court for the District of New Jersey
 e.g.,"D. Mass." = United States District Court for the District of Massachusetts 
 "E." = Eastern; "M." = Middle; "N." = Northern; "S." = Southern; "W." = Western
 e.g.,"C.C.S.D.N.Y." = United States Circuit Court for the Southern District of New York
 e.g.,"M.D. Ala." = United States District Court for the Middle District of Alabama
 "Ct. Cl." = United States Court of Claims
 The abbreviation of a state's name alone indicates the highest appellate court in that state's judiciary at the time. 
 e.g.,"Pa." = Supreme Court of Pennsylvania
 e.g.,"Me." = Supreme Judicial Court of Maine

List of cases in 4 U.S. (4 Dall.)

Cases of the Supreme Court of the United States

Cases of other tribunals

Notes and References

See also
 certificate of division

External links
  Case reports in volume 4 (4 Dall.) from Court Listener
  Case reports in volume 4 (4 Dall.) from the Caselaw Access Project of Harvard Law School
  Case reports in volume 4 (4 Dall.) from Justia
  Case reports in volume 4 (4 Dall.) from Open Jurist
 Website of the United States Supreme Court
 United States Courts website about the Supreme Court
 National Archives, Records of the Supreme Court of the United States
 American Bar Association, How Does the Supreme Court Work?
 The Supreme Court Historical Society

1799 in United States case law
1800 in United States case law
1801 in United States case law
1802 in United States case law
1803 in United States case law
1804 in United States case law
1806 in United States case law